Kenyonville is a hamlet in Orleans County, New York, United States. It is named after Barber Kenyon, a native of East Greenwich in Washington County, who first settled in that location, erecting a grist mill and saw mill. The community is located along the Oak Orchard Creek, 2.3 miles north of the historic Ridge Road. In 1894, the community consisted of a post office, store, blacksmith shop, wagon shop, grist mill, saw mill, and a Methodist church.

References 

Hamlets in Orleans County, New York